The following is a list of episodes from the TVB drama, Moonlight Resonance which is the indirect sequel to award-winning series, Heart of Greed. The episodes for Moonlight Resonance were rated PG. There were a total of forty episodes. In Hong Kong, episode 39 and 40 were aired together as episode 39.

List of episodes
Episode 1 - 5

Episode 6 - 10

Episode 11 - 15

Episode 16 - 20

Episode 21 - 25

Episode 26 - 30

Episode 31 - 35

Episode 36 - 40

DVD release

See also
Moonlight Resonance
Heart of Greed
List of TVB series (2007)

Lists of Chinese drama television series episodes